Cal State LA station (officially Cal State Los Angeles station) is a commuter train and bus station located on the El Monte Busway. The station is located between Interstate 10 and its namesake, the campus of California State University, Los Angeles. It is located in the El Sereno neighborhood of the City of Los Angeles and Eastside region, in southern California. The busway portion of the station opened on February 18, 1975 and the Metrolink platform was added on October 26, 1994.

Just west of this station, the westbound busway lanes cross over the eastbound lanes, reversing the normal placement of the lanes. They remain reversed until the western terminus of the El Monte Busway at Union Station.  The reversed lanes allow buses to serve by a single island platform station at the Los Angeles County+USC Medical Center but prevent vehicles from entering the busway from the general-purpose lanes of Interstate 10 in the eastbound direction.

Just east of this station, the busway and train tracks move off the separate right of way and move into the median of Interstate 10.

Service 
The station is served by the Metrolink San Bernardino Line commuter rail line and two bus rapid transit routes: the J Line, operated by Metro and the Silver Streak, operated by Foothill Transit.

Metro's Express 487 route operates all-day, seven days a week; the rest only run during weekday peak periods.

Local bus connections 
Cal State LA station is also served by several bus routes that use bus stops near the station on surface streets:
Alhambra Community Transit: Blue
Edmund D. Edelman Children's Court Shuttle
El Sol: East Los Angeles College/City Terrace
Monterey Park Spirit Bus: 5

Station layout 
Cal State LA station has a unique multi-level design. The street-level facilities are on the south end of the Cal State LA campus and include ticket vending machines and bus plaza. The westbound busway platform is one level below the street level. On the lowest level, the train platform is located directly under the westbound busway platform and the eastbound busway platform is reached from a bridge across both lanes of the busway.

Gallery

References

External links 

Los Angeles Metro Busway stations
Metrolink stations in Los Angeles County, California
J Line (Los Angeles Metro)
California State University, Los Angeles
Eastside Los Angeles
El Sereno, Los Angeles
Railway stations in Los Angeles
Railway stations in California at university and college campuses
Railway stations in the United States opened in 1994
1994 establishments in California
Bus stations in Los Angeles
Railway stations in highway medians